"Mountain at My Gates" is a song by English rock band Foals. It was released as the second single from their fourth studio album, What Went Down, on 21 July 2015. The song peaked at number one on the US Billboard Alternative Songs chart, number 35 on the Belgian Flanders Tip Singles Chart, number 87 on the UK Singles Chart, and number 192 on the French Singles Chart. The song was also featured in the soundtrack for the video game FIFA 16.

Music video
The official music video, lasting four minutes and eleven seconds, was uploaded to the official Foals YouTube channel on 29 July 2015. It is a spherical video taken in 4K quality with a GoPro and filmed at the Alexandra Road Estate. A non-spherical version of the video is also available for viewing.

Track listing

Charts

Weekly charts

Year-end charts

Certifications

Release history

References

2015 singles
2015 songs
Foals songs
Songs written by Yannis Philippakis